White Oaks Mall may refer to:

 White Oaks Mall (London, Ontario)
 White Oaks Mall (Springfield, Illinois)